In many languages, the colors described in English as "blue" and "green" are colexified, i.e. expressed using a single cover term. To describe this English lexical gap, linguists use the portmanteau word grue, from green and blue, a term coined by the philosopher Nelson Goodman—with a rather different meaning—in his 1955 Fact, Fiction, and Forecast to illustrate his "new riddle of induction".

The exact definition of "blue" and "green" may be complicated by the speakers not primarily distinguishing the hue, but using terms that describe other color components such as saturation and luminosity, or other properties of the object being described. For example, "blue" and "green" might be distinguished, but a single term might be used for both if the color is dark. Furthermore, green might be associated with yellow, and blue with either black or gray.

According to Brent Berlin and Paul Kay's 1969 study Basic Color Terms: Their Universality and Evolution, distinct terms for brown, purple, pink, orange, and gray will not emerge in a language until the language has made a distinction between green and blue. In their account of the development of color terms the first terms to emerge are those for white/black (or light/dark), red and green/yellow.

Afro-Asiatic

Amazigh
The word for blue in the Amazigh language is azerwal. In some dialects of Amazigh, like Shilha or Kabyle, the word azegzaw is used for both green and blue.

Arabic
The color of the sky is sometimes referred to as "the green" in Classical Arabic poetry, in which it is al-khaḍrā&apos;. In Arabic the word for blue is generally azraq. The Arabic word for green is  akhḍar.

In Moroccan Arabic, the word for light blue is šíbi, whereas zraq stands for blue and khḍar for green. The word zrag is used to describe the color of a suffocated person, and is also used pejoratively as a synonym to "dumb, stupid".

Egyptian
The ancient Egyptian word wadjet covered the range of blue, blue-green, and green. On the one hand, it was the name of a goddess, the patroness of Lower Egypt, represented as a cobra called Wadjet, "the green one", or as the Eye of Horus, also called by the same name. On the other hand, wedjet was the word used for Egyptian blue in faience ceramics.

Hebrew
In Hebrew, the word "" (pronounced ) means blue, while "" (pronounced ) means green and has the same root,  (j-r-q), as the word for "vegetables". Like Russian and Italian, Hebrew has a separate name for light blue ("t'khelet")—the color of the sky and of fringes (tzitzit) on the ritual garment tallit. This color has special symbolic significance in both Judaism and Jewish culture.

American languages

Chahta
The Choctaw language has two words, okchʋko and okchʋmali, which have different meanings depending on the source. In 1852 okchakko is translated variously as pale blue or pale green, okchakko chohmi (somewhat okchakko) is given as swarthy, and okchamali is defined as deep blue, gray, green, or sky blue. In 1880 okchakko and okchʋmali are both given as blue, and green is not specifically listed as a color. In an 1892 dictionary, okchamali is deep blue or green, okchakko is pale blue or bright green, and a third word kili̱koba is bright green (resembling a kili̱kki, a species of parrot). By 1915, the authoritative Byington dictionary gives okchako as blue and okchamali as green, blue, gray, verdant. A current coursebook differentiates based on brightness, giving okchʋko as bright blue/green and okchʋmali as pale or dull blue/green. Modern usage in the Choctaw Nation of Oklahoma language school is to use okchʋko for blue and okchʋmali for green, with no distinction for brightness.

Kanienʼkéha
The language of the Kanien'kehá:ka Nation at Akwesasne is at Stage VII on the Berlin–Kay Scale, and possesses distinct terms for a broad range of spectral and nonspectral colors such as blue (oruía), green (óhute), black (kahúji), white (karákA), and gray (atakArókwa). According to one researcher, the Kanien'kehá:ka term for purple (arihwawakunéha) translates to 'bishop['s color]', a recent, post-Christianization coinage. The way in which purple was categorized and referenced prior to the addition of the latter term is not clear.

Lakota
In the Lakota Sioux language, the word tȟó is used for both blue and green, though the word tȟózi (a mixture of the words tȟó meaning "blue (green)," and zí meaning "yellow") has become common (zítȟo can also be used). This is in line with common practice of using zíša/šázi for orange (šá meaning "red"), and šátȟo/tȟóša for "purple/violet."

Mapudungun
Mapudungun distinguishes between black (kurü), blue (kallfü) and green (karü, also meaning "raw" or "immature"). The word payne was formerly used to refer to a sky blue, and also refers to the bluish color of stones (Zúñiga, 2006).

Mayan
Single words for blue/green are also found in Mayan languages; for example, in the Yukatek Maya language blue/green is yax.

Tupian
Tupian languages did not originally differ between the two colors, though they may now as a result of interference of Spanish (in the case of Guaraní) or Portuguese (in the case of Nheengatu). The Tupi word oby meant both, as does the Guaraní hovy. In modern Tupi (nheengatu) you can use the word "suikiri" for green and "iakira/akira" for blue, but they are still interchangeable, because "iakira/akira" also means immature, as in "pakua akira" (green banana/immature banana), and "suikiri" can also mean blue. In modern Guarani, they use "hovy" for blue and "hovy'û" (which literally means "dark green/blue") for green. So "hovy" can still be used for green, and "hovy'û" can be used for dark blue shades. They also have the word "aky", cognate with nheengatu "akira", and it means green/immature too.

Yebamasa
The Yebamasa of the Rio Piraparana region in Vaupés Department, southeastern Colombia, use the term sumese for both blue and green. The letter "u" is pronounced like the German "ü".

Austronesian languages

Filipino (Tagalog)
Speakers of Tagalog most commonly use the Spanish loanwords for blue and green—asul (from Spanish azul) and berde (from Spanish verde), respectively. Although these words are much more common in spoken use, Tagalog has native terms: bugháw for blue and lunti(án) for green, which are seen as archaic and more flowery. These are mostly confined to formal and academic writings, alongside artistic fields such literature, music, and poetry.

In Cebuano, another major Philippine language, the native words for "blue" and "green" end in the same syllable: pughaw and lunhaw, respectively. Pughaw means sky blue, while lunhaw is fresh leaf green (i.e. neither brownish nor yellowish).

Humor and jokes of a sexual or derogatory nature that would otherwise be described as "blue" in English (e.g. "blue comedy", "blue joke") are called "green" in Philippine English. This is a calque of the Hispanic term chiste verde.

Javanese
Modern Javanese has distinct words for blue biru and green ijo. These words are derived from Old Javanese birū and hijo. However, in Old Javanese birū could mean pale blue, grayish blue, greenish blue, or even turquoise, while hijo which means green, could also mean the blue-green color of clear water. Biru and ijo in Modern Javanese are cognates of Malay/Indonesian biru and hijau which both have the same meaning.

Dravidian

Kannada
The Kannada language distinguishes between blue (neeli - ನೀಲಿ), green (hasiru - ಹಸಿರು) and yellow (haladi - ಹಳದಿ). The prefix kadu (ಕಡು) would indicate darker colors while the prefix tili (ತಿಳಿ) would indicate light colors. Thus kaduneeli (ಕಡುನೀಲಿ) would mean dark/deep blue, while tilineeli (ತಿಳಿನೀಲಿ) would mean light blue.

Tamil
The Tamil language distinguishes between the colors  green (paccai),  blue (neelam) and  black (karuppu). The prefix karu- would indicate dark colors while the suffix iḷam would indicate light colors. Thus  karumpaccai would be dark green.

Telugu
The Telugu language uses a single word,  pacca, for green and yellow. To differentiate between the two shades, another word is prefixed in some cases. For example, green will be called  ākupacca "leaf-pacca" and yellow  pasupupacca "turmeric-pacca".

Malayalam
In Malayalam there are distinct words for blue (neela - നീല), green (pachcha - പച്ച) and yellow (manja - മഞ്ഞ).

East Asian languages

Chinese
The modern Chinese language has the blue–green distinction (藍 lán for blue and 綠 lǜ for green); however, another word that predates the modern vernacular, qīng, is also used in many contexts. The character depicts the budding of a young plant and it could be understood as "verdant", but the word is used to describe colors ranging from light and yellowish green through deep blue all the way to black, as in xuánqīng  For example, the flag of the Republic of China is referred to as qīng tiān, bái rì, mǎn dì hóng ("A Blue Sky, White Sun, and Wholly Red Earth") whereas qīngcài  is the Chinese word for "green vegetable," referring to bok choy, and the opposing sides of the game liubo were known as qīng and white in antiquity despite using black and white pieces. Qīng was the traditional designation of both blue and green for much of the history of the Chinese language, while lán originally referred to the dye of the indigo plant. However, lǜ as a particular 'shade' of qīng applied to cloth and clothing has been attested since the Book of Odes (1000600BC), as in the title of Ode 27  "Green Upper Garment") in the Airs of Bei section. After the discarding of Classical Chinese in favor of modern vernacular Chinese, the modern terms for blue and green are now more commonly used than qīng as standalone color terms, although qīng is still part of many common noun phrases. In modern scientific contexts, qīng refers to cyan as distinguished from both blue and green.

Japanese

Ancient Japanese did not have this distinction: the word midori came into use only in the Heian period and, at that time and for a long time thereafter, midori was still considered a shade of ao. Educational materials distinguishing green and blue came into use only after World War II; thus, even though most Japanese consider them to be green, the word ao is still used to describe certain vegetables, apples, and vegetation. Ao is also the word used to refer to the color on a traffic light that signals drivers to "go". However, most other objects—a green car, a green sweater, etc.—will generally be called midori. Japanese people also sometimes use the word , based on the English word "green", for colors. The language also has several other words meaning specific shades of green and blue.

Korean
The native Korean word  (Revised Romanization: pureu-da) may mean either blue or green, or bluish green. Another word 파랗다 (para-ta) usually means blue, but sometimes it also means green, as in 파란 불 (para-n bul, green light of a traffic light). There are Sino-Korean expressions that refer to green and blue. (chorok adj./n.),  (choroksaek n. or for short,  noksaek n.) is used for green. Cheong , another expression borrowed from Chinese (靑), is mostly used for blue, as in 청바지/靑-- (cheong-baji, blue jeans") and Cheong Wa Dae, the Blue House, which is the former executive office and official residence of the President of the Republic of Korea, but is also used for green as well, as in 청과물/靑果物 (cheong-gwamul, fruits and vegetables) and 청포도/靑葡萄 (cheong-podo, green grape).

Tibetan
In Tibetan, སྔོན་པོ། (Wylie sngon po) is the term traditionally given for the color of the sky and of grass. This term also falls into the general pattern of naming colors by appending the suffix "po", as in "mar po" (red); "ser po" (yellow); "nag po" (black); and "dkar po" (white). Conspicuously, the term for "green" is "ljang khu", likely related to "ljang bu", and defined as—"the grue (sngon po) sprout of wheat or barley".

Vietnamese
Vietnamese used to not use separate words for green and blue, with both blue and green being denoted as xanh. This is a colloquial rendering of thanh (靑), as with Chinese and Japanese. In modern usage, blue and green are distinguished. Shades of blue are specifically described as xanh da trời (light blue skin of sky), or xanh dương, xanh nước biển, (deep blue of ocean). Green is described as xanh lá cây (color of leaves). 

Vietnamese occasionally employs the terms xanh lam (blue) and xanh lục (green) in which the second syllables is derived from the Chinese: 藍 and 綠 respectively, sometimes skipping the syllable xanh, for blue and green, respectively, in formal or scientific speech. Xanh can also be used singularly for any color that is the shade in between blue and green inclusively.

Mongolian
In Mongolian, the word for green is ногоон (nogoon). Mongolian distinguishes between dark and light blue. The word for light blue is цэнхэр (tsenher), and the word for dark blue is хөх (höh).

Indo-European

Albanian
Albanian has two major words for "blue": kaltër refers to a light blue, such as that of the sky, but it is derived from Vulgar Latin calthinus, itself derived from caltha, a loan from Ancient Greek that meant "marigold" a small and in fact yellow flower. The other word, blu, refers to a darker shade of blue, and like many similar words across many European languages, derives ultimately from Germanic (see also: Italian blu). There is a separate word for green, gjelbër, which derives from the Latin galbinus, which originally meant "yellow" (cf. German gelb); the original Latin word for green on the other hand, viridis, is the source of the Albanian word for "yellow", verdhë. Albanian also has a borrowed word for green, jeshil, from Turkish yeşil; it tends to be used for non-natural greens (such as traffic signals) in contrast to gjelbër.

Baltic

There are separate words for green (zaļš) and blue (zils) in Latvian. Both zils and zaļš stem from the same Proto-Indo-European word for yellow (*ghel). Several other words in Latvian have been derived from these colors, namely grass is called zāle (from zaļš), while the name for iris is zīlīte (from zils).

The now archaic word mēļš was used to describe both dark blue and black (probably indicating that previously zils was used only for lighter shades of blue). For instance, blueberries and blackberries are called mellenes.

In Latvian black is "melns" (in some local dialects "mells").

In Lithuanian žalias is green, mėlynas is blue and žilas is gray (hair), grizzled.

Slavic
Bulgarian, a South Slavic language, makes a clear distinction between blue (синьо, sinyo), green (зелено, zeleno), and black (черно, cherno).

In the Polish language, blue (niebieski from niebo – sky) and green (zielony) are treated as separate colors. The word for sky blue or azure—błękitny—might be considered either a basic color or a shade of blue by different speakers. Similarly dark blue or navy blue (granatowy—deriving from the name of pomegranate (granat), some cultivars of which are dark purplish blue in color) can be considered by some speakers as a separate basic color. Black (czarny) is completely distinguished from blue. As in English, Polish distinguishes pink ("różowy") from red ("czerwony").

The word siwy means blue-gray in Polish (literally: "color of gray hair"). The word siny refers to violet-blue and is used to describe the color of bruises ("siniaki"), hematoma, and the blue skin discoloration that can result from moderate hypothermia.

Russian does not have a single word referring to the whole range of colors denoted by the English term "blue". Instead, it traditionally treats light blue (голубой, goluboy) as a separate color independent from plain or dark blue (синий, siniy), with all seven "basic" colors of the spectrum (red–orange–yellow–green–голубой / goluboy (sky blue, light azure, but does not equal cyan)–синий / siniy ("true" deep blue, like synthetic ultramarine)–violet) while in English the light blues like azure and cyan are considered mere shades of "blue" and not different colors. The Russian word for "green" is зелёный, zielioniy. To better understand this, consider that English makes a similar distinction between "red" and light red (pink, which is considered a different color and not merely a kind of red), but such a distinction is unknown in several other languages; for example, both "red" (hóng, traditionally called ), and "pink" (fěn hóng, lit. "powder red") have traditionally been considered varieties of a single color in Chinese. The Russian language also distinguishes between red (красный, krasniy) and pink (розовый, rozoviy).

Similarly, English language descriptions of rainbows have often distinguished between blue or turquoise and indigo, the latter of which is often described as dark blue or ultramarine.

The Serbo-Croatian color system makes a distinction between blue, green and black:

Blue: plav (indicates any blue) and modar; in the eastern speaking areas modar indicates dark blue, in some of the western areas it may indicate any blue
Navy blue: teget (mainly in the eastern speaking areas)
Ash blue: sinj(i) (espetially in Dalmatia to describe sea in stormy weather: sinje more)
Green: zelen
Black: crn

Modar may also mean dark blue and dark purple that are used to describe colours of a bruise, modrica. Native speakers cannot pinpoint a color on the spectrum which would correspond to modra.

Sinj, cognate to Bulgarian синьо, sinyo/Russian синий, siniy, is archaic, and denotes blue-gray, usually used to describe dark seas.

Turquoise is usually described as tirkizan, and similarly, azure will use a loan word azuran.  There is no specific word for cyan. Blond hair is called plava ('blue'), reflecting likely the archaic use of "plav" for any bright white/blue colors (like the sky).

Mrk "dusky" can refer either dark brown, less often dark gray, or even black. It is etymologically derived from the word for "darkness" (mrak), but is distinct from "dark" (taman). For instance, it is used to describe the brown bear (mrki medved/medvjed). Smeđ and kestenjast refer brown,  crven means red, ružičast is for pink and narandžast designates orange.

Shades are defined with a prefix (e.g. "tamno-" for dark, or "svetlo-/svijetlo-" for light), for example, dark blue = "tamnoplav".

The Slovene language distinguishes among blue, green and black

 Blue: moder (officially) or plav (vernacular) is used for any blue. Sometimes a word sinj (adj. sinje) is also used to describe azure. The word akvamarin is sometimes used for navy-blue.
 Green: zelen is related to the word zel, which is derived from Proto-Slavic word "зель" for "herb" - which in turn is believed to be derived from Proto-Indo-European word for "to shine", which also described light shades of colors (gold, yellow and green).
 Black: Črn

Although the blue and green color are not strictly defined, so Slovene speakers cannot point to a certain shade of blue or green, but rather the whole spectrum of blue and green shades, there is a distinction between light and dark hues of these colors, which is described with prefixes svetlo- (light) and temno- (dark).

Transient hues between blue and green are mostly described as zeleno moder or modro zelen, sometimes as turkizen (turquoise). Transient hues between green and yellow (rumena) are described as rumeno zelen or zeleno rumen.

Celtic
The Welsh, Cornish and Breton word glas is usually translated as "blue"; however, it can also refer, variously, to the color of the sea, of grass, or of silver (cf. Greek γλαυκός). The word gwyrdd (a borrowing from Latin viridis) is the standard translation for "green". In traditional Welsh (and related languages), glas could refer to certain shades of green and gray as well as blue, and llwyd could refer to various shades of gray and brown. Perhaps under the influence of English, modern Welsh is trending toward the 11-color Western scheme, restricting glas to blue and using gwyrdd for green, llwyd for gray and brown for brown, respectively. However, the more traditional usage is still heard today in the Welsh for grass (glaswellt or gwelltglas), and in fossilized expressions such as caseg las (gray mare), tir glas (green land), papur llwyd (brown paper) and even red for brown in siwgwr coch (brown sugar).

In Modern Irish and Scottish Gaelic the word for "blue" is gorm (whence the name Cairngorm mountains derives) – a borrowing of the now obsolete Early Welsh word gwrm, meaning "dark blue" or "dusky". A relic of the original meaning ("dusky", "dark brown") survives in the Irish term daoine gorma, meaning "Black people".

In Old and Middle Irish, like in Welsh, glas was a blanket term for colors ranging from green to blue to various shades of gray (e.g. the glas of a sword, the glas of stone, etc.). In Modern Irish, it has come to mean both various shades of green, with specific reference to plant hues,  and gray (like the sea), respectively; other shades of green would be referred to in Modern Irish as uaine or uaithne, while liath is gray proper (like a stone).

Scottish Gaelic uses the term uaine for "green". However, the dividing line between it and gorm is somewhat different than between the English "green" and "blue", with uaine signifying a light green or yellow-green, and gorm extending from dark blue (what in English might be navy blue) to include the dark green or blue-green of vegetation. Grass, for instance, is gorm, rather than uaine. In addition, liath covers a range from light blue to light gray. However, the term for a green apple, such as a Granny Smith, would be ubhal glas.

The boundary between colors varies much more than the "focal point": e.g. an island known in Breton as Enez c'hlas ("the blue island") is l'Île Verte ("the green island") in French, in both cases referring to the grayish-green color of its bushes, even though both languages distinguish green from blue.

Romance
The Romance terms for "green" (Catalan , French , Italian, Portuguese, Romanian and Spanish ) are all from Latin . The terms for "blue", on the other hand, vary: Catalan , Occitan , French  and Italian  come from a Germanic root, whereas the Spanish and Portuguese azul is likely to come from Arabic. French bleu was in turn loaned into many other languages, including English. Latin itself did not have a word covering all shades of blue, which may help explain these borrowings.

French, as most Romance languages, makes roughly the same distinctions as English and has a specific term for each of blue (""), green ("") and gray (""). For all three, different shades can be indicated with different (compound) terms, none of them being considered as basic color terms: "bleu " (light blue), "bleu " (sky blue), "bleu " (Navy blue), "bleu " (royal blue); "vert clair" (light green), "vert " (literally: apple green); "gris " (deep gray), "gris " (literally: "mouse gray"). French also uses "" for the lighter shade of blue of the sunny sky, that was in turn loaned to English as "azure".

Catalan distinguishes blue from green and gray. Other basic or common colors by its own right are  "purple",  "yellow",  or  "orange",  "red",  "pink",  "brown",  "gray",  "black" and  "white". For all these colors except black and white it is possible to indicate different shades using  "light" and  "dark"; for blue, though, it generally is blau cel "sky blue" and blau marí "sea blue". Other words and compounds are common to indicate more elaborated shades (verd llimona "lemon green", rosa pàl·lid "pale pink", lila "lilac", granat "carmine", ocre "ocher", verd oliva "olive green", etc.). Catalan actually distinguishes two reds with different and common words: while  refers to the color of blood,  is a red tending towards yellow or the color of clay.

Italian distinguishes blue, green and gray. , indigo. , the equivalent of the English azure, is usually considered a separate basic color rather than a shade of blu (similar to the distinction in English between red and pink). Some sources even go to the point of defining blu as a darker shade of azzurro. Celeste literally means '(the color) of the sky' and can be used as synonym of azzurro, although it will more often be considered a less saturated hue. (aquamarine) literally "sea water", indicates an even lighter, almost transparent, shade of blue. To indicate a mix of green and blue, Italians might say verde , literally water green. The term , not common in standard Italian and perceived as a literary term, is used in scientific contexts (esp. botany) to indicate a mix of blue, green and gray.

In Portuguese, the word "" means blue and the word "" means green. Furthermore, "azul-" means light-blue, and "azul-" means dark-blue. More distinctions can be made between several hues of blue. For instance, "azul-" means sky blue, "azul-" means navy-blue and "azul-" means turquoise-blue. One can also make the distinction between "verde-claro" and "verde-escuro", meaning light and dark-green respectively, and more distinctions between several qualities of green: for instance, "verde-" means olive-green and "verde-" means emerald-green. Cyan is usually called "azul-celeste" (sky blue) and "verde-", meaning water green.

Romanian clearly distinguishes between the colors green and blue. It also uses separate words for different hues of the same color, e.g. light blue, blue (albastru), dark-blue (bleu- or ), along with a word for turquoise and azure ( or ).

Similarly to French, Romanian, Italian and Portuguese, Spanish distinguishes blue and green and has an additional term for the tone of blue visible in the sky, namely "", which is nonetheless considered a shade of blue.

Germanic
In Old Norse, the word  "blue" (from proto-Germanic ) was also used to describe black (and the common word for people of African descent was thus  'blue/black men'). In Swedish, the modern word for blue, was used this way until the early 20th century, and it still is to a limited extent in modern Faroese.

German and Dutch distinguish blue (respectively  and ) and green ( and ) very similarly to English. There are (compound) terms for light blue ( and ) and darker shades of blue ( and ). In addition, adjective forms of most traditional color names are inflected to match the corresponding noun's case and gender.

Greek
The words for “blue” and “green” completely changed in the transition from Ancient Greek to Modern Greek.

The words had more than one modern meaning: in addition to “clear light blue”,  also meant “turquoise” and “teal-green” – it was the typical description of the color of the goddess Athena’s eyes, portrayed as either gray or light blue. As well as “bright green”,  was also used for “acid yellow” (compare “chlorophyll”). Furthermore,  not only meant “turquoise” and “teal-green”, but could mean either a “dark blue” or “dark green” or just “blue” (adopted into English as “cyan” for light sky-blue).

It is not known if those groups’ names influenced the word change or if they were named using the new color terms, but whichever way it went,  is a Modern Greek word for “green”.

In the Modern Greek language, there are names for light and dark blues and greens in addition to those discussed above:

As a rule, the first two words of the list are accepted as shades of blue, and the rest as shades of green. Also  /  for violet blue (which is, however, usually considered as a shade of purple, rather than blue).

Iranian
Ossetian has only one word for blue, light blue and green—цъæх (tsəh), which also means "gray" and "glaucous"—but it also has a separate word for green, кæрдæгхуыз (kərdəghuɨz), literally "grassy" (from кæрдæг "grass"). The latter derives from кæрдын (kərdɨn) "to mow" (like in German Heu (hau) < hauen (to mow)).

Ossetian also has separate words for the following colors:
 light blue: æрвхуыз (ərvhuɨz) from æрвон "sky"
 glaucous: бæлонхуыз (bəlonhuɨz) from бæлон "pigeon" (a calque from Russian, cf. голубой (light blue) < голубь (pigeon)); also фæздæгхуыз (fəzdəghuɨz) from fazdag "smoke", from Old Persian *pazdaka-, cognate of Latin pedis (louse)
 blue: копрадзхуыз (kopradzhuɨz), from копрадз (kopradz) - bluing for laundering, transliteration of Russian купорос (kuporos) "vitriol" from Latin cuprum "copper"
 gray: фæныкхуыз (fənykhuɨz), from фæнык (fənyk) "ashes", originating from Persian *pa(s)nu-ka, or Russian cognate песок (pesok) "sand"

Pashto uses the word shīn to denote blue as well as green. Shinkay, a word derived from shīn, means 'greenery' but shīn āsmān means 'blue sky'. One way to disambiguate is to ask "Shīn like the sky? Or shīn like plants?" (Blue and green are however distinguished using different words in the eastern parts of Afghanistan and Pakistan, due to contact with other languages.)

Persian words for blue include  ābi (literally the color of water, from āb 'water'), for blue generally;  nili (from nil, 'indigo dye'), for deeper shades of blue such as the color of rain clouds;  fayruzeh 'turquoise stone', used to describe the color of blue eyes;  lājvardi or  lāzhvardi 'lapis lazuli color', source of the words lazuli and azure;  nilufari 'water lily color'; and  kabud, an old literary word for 'blue'.

The Persian word for green is  sabz. As in Sudan, dark-skinned people may be described as "green".

The color of the sky is variously described in Persian poetry using the words sabz, fayruzeh, nil, lājvardi, or nilufari— literally "green", "indigo", "turquoise", "azure" or "the color of water lilies". For example, sabz-ākhor "green stable", sabz-āshyāneh "green ceiling", sabz-ayvān "green balcony", sabz-bādbān "green sail", sabz-bāgh "green garden", sabz-farsh "green carpet", sabz-golshan "green flower-garden", sabz-kārgāh "green workshop", sabz-khvān "green table", sabz-manzareh "green panorama", sabz-maydān "green field" sabz-pol "green bridge", sabz-tāq "green arch", sabz-tasht "green bowl", and sabz-tā'us "green peacock" are poetic epithets for the sky—in addition to similar compounds using the words for blue, e.g. lājvardi-saqf "lapis lazuli-colored roof" or fayruzeh-tasht "turquoise bowl". Moreover, the words for green of Arabic origin  akhzar and  khazrā are used for epithets of the sky or heaven, such as charkh-e akhzar "green wheel".

Indo-Aryan
Chinalbashe (an unclassified Indo-Aryan language) & Chambyali (a Western Pahari language) have the same term for blue & green i.e. Takri:  ISO: .

Other Indo-Aryan languages distinguish blue from green. In Urdu, blue is نیلا (nīlā) and green is سبز (sabz). There are some names of shades of blue as well, like فیروزی (ferozī) "turquoise".
In Hindi, blue is नीला (nīlā) and green is हरा (harā).
In Marathi, blue is निळा (niḽā) and green is हिरवा (hiravā).

Niger-Congo A
In Yoruba, there are only three fundamental terms for colors, one of them, the word "dúdú," is used for the word black and colors such as blue, green, purple, and grey. In modern times, unique terms for the colors are formed based on descriptive markers or English loan words, àwọ̀ ewé, (meaning colors of the leaves), is used for green, while búlùú (from English "blue") or àwọ̀ aró (color of dye), is used for blue.

Niger-Congo B (Bantu)

isiZulu and isiXhosa
Zulu and Xhosa use the word -luhlaza (the prefix changes according to the class of the noun) for blue/green. Speakers of the two mutually intelligible languages can add a descriptive word after the colour term to differentiate between the two colours i.e. "(lu)hlaza okwesibhakabhaka" meaning - 'like the sky' or (lu)hlaza okwotshani meaning -'like grass'.

Kiswahili
The Swahili word for blue is buluu, which is derived directly from English and has been in the language for a relatively short time. For other colors, Swahili uses either rangi ya ___ (the color of ___) or a shortened version, -a ___. For example, green is rangi ya kijani or rangi ya majani, which means the color of grass/leaves. Sky blue is rangi ya samawati, or the color of the sky from the Arabic word for sky. (Note: all of these can be written as -a kijani, -a majani, -a samwati, etc.)

OtjiHimba
The Himba people use a single word for shades of green and blue: buru. They curiously have only three other color names; thus, their limited color perception has both aroused interest in anthropologists, who have studied this phenomenon.

Setswana
Tswana uses the same word tala to refer to both blue and green. One has to deduce from the context and prior knowledge, of what is being talked about, to be able to pinpoint exactly the color in question.

Northern Caucusus languages

In the language Tsakhur, not only are blue and green distinguished, but also turquoise.

Other European languages

Basque
The Basque language has three native color words derived from ur (water). Urdin, is nowadays used in most cases for blue. Ubel originally meant "flash flood" and, with respect to colors, refers to bruises. Begi ubela would be translated into English by "a black and blue eye". But in Basque, unlike English, ubel remains in use after the hit skin has lost its purple color and become pale, why this word is used for both "purple" in particular and "pale hue" in general. Uher originally meant "dirty", "still water" or "rusty"; it is used for gray or sienna tones, and more generally for dark colors. Green is usually expressed with the loan-word berde from Spanish "verde" / French "vert". The authenticity of the less common Basque terms for green (h)orlegi and musker is disputed.

Uralic
Finnish makes a distinction between vihreä (green) and sininen (blue). Turquoise or teal (turkoosi or sinivihreä) is considered to be a separate, intermediate color between green and blue, and black (musta) is also differentiated from blue.

The name for blue, sininen, is shared with other Finnic languages and is thus dated to the era of the Proto-Finnic language (ca. 2000 years old). However, it is also shared with the Slavic languages (Russian синий, siniy), suggesting that it could be a loanword (most probable from Indo-Iranian Scythian language; see Proto-Finnic *sini, Proto-Slavic *siňь). The word vihreä (viher-, archaic viheriä, viheriäinen) is related to vehreä "verdant" and vihanta "green", and viha "hate", originally "poison". It is not shared with Estonian, in which it is roheline, probably related with the Estonian word rohi "grass". However, the form viha does have correspondences in related languages as far as Permic languages, where it means not only "poison" but "bile" or "green or yellow". It has been originally loaned from an Indo-Iranian protolanguage and is related to Latin virus "poison". Furthermore, the word musta "black" is also of Finnic origin.

The differentiation of several colors by hue is at least Finnic (a major subgroup of Uralic) in origin. Before this, only red (punainen) was clearly distinguished by hue, with other colors described in terms of brightness (valkea vs. musta), using non-color adjectives for further specificity. Alternatively, it appears that the distinction between valkea and musta was in fact "clean, shining" vs. "dirty, murky". The original meaning of sini was possibly either "black/dark" or "green". Mauno Koski's theory is that dark colors of high saturation—both blue and green—would be sini, while shades of color with low saturation, such as dark brown or black, would be musta. Although it is theorized that originally vihreä was not a true color name and was used to describe plants only, the occurrence of vihreä or viha as a name of a color in several related languages shows that it was probably polysemic (meaning both "green" and "verdant") already in early Baltic-Finnic. However, whatever the case with these theories, differentiation of blue and green must be at least as old as the Baltic-Finnic languages.

Hungarian makes the distinction between green (zöld) and blue (kék), and also distinguishes black (fekete). Intermediate colors between green and blue are commonly referred to as zöldeskék (literally greenish-blue) or kékeszöld (bluish-green), but names for specific colors in this continuum—like turquoise (türkiz)—also exist. Particular shades of a color can also have separate names, such as azure (azúr).

Turkic

Kazakh
The Kazakh language, like many Turkic languages, distinguishes between kök for blue and jasâl for green. In Kazakh, many adjectival variations can be found referring to perceived gradations in saturation level of "blue", such as kögildir, kökshil, and kökboz, which respectively denominate the gradual decrease in the intensity, kökboz being often used as a color referent in its own right. Kök is occasionally used to denote green plants (e.g. 'kök' shöp'), but such usage is mostly confined to poetic utterances or certain localized dialects.

Turkish
Turkish treats dark or navy blue (lacivert, from the same Persian root as English azure and lapis lazuli) as a separate color from plain or light blue (mavi). Mavi is derived from the Arabic word مائي mā'ī 'like water' (ماء mā being the Arabic word for water) and lacivert is derived from Persian لاجورد lājvard 'lapis lazuli', a semiprecious stone with the color of navy blue. In the pre-Islamic religion of the Turks, blue is the color that represented the east, as well as the zodiac sign Aquarius (the Water Bearer). A characteristic tone of blue, turquoise, was much used by the Turks for their traditional decorations and jewelry.

In traditional pre-Islamic Turkic culture, both blue and green were represented by the same name, gök 'sky'. The name is still in use in many rural areas. For instance, in many regions of Turkey, when mold is formed on cheese, the phenomenon is called göğermek 'turning into the color of sky (gök)'.

See also

References

Sources
Etymological Dictionary of Basque

Color in culture
Color names
Language comparison
Lexicology